Voices from the East is a 2017 live concert album by Mohsen Namjoo and Nederlands Blazers Ensemble

Track listing
1- Zolf (Arranged by Willem van Merwijk) (live) – 3:25
2- Terra aria (Arranged by Tom Trapp) (live) Nederlands Blazers Ensemble – 3:51
3- Sanama (Arranged by Willem van Merwijk) (live) – 5:28
4- Qashqai (Arranged by Willem van Merwijk) (live) – 4:59
5- Beirut (Arranged by Misha Sporck) (live) Nederlands Blazers Ensemble – 5:25
6- Hichi (Live) – 6:39
7- Poucha Dass (Arranged by Willem van Merwijk) (live) Nederlands Blazers Ensemble – 4:56
8- Daf (Arranged by Kayavash Nourai) (live) – 4:31
9- Ballad at the End of Time (Arranged by Ron Ford) (live) Nederlands Blazers Ensemble – 4:36
10- Gitti de gitti (Arranged by Tolga Zafer Ozdemir) (live) Nederlands Blazers Ensemble – 4:06
11- Nobahari Arranged by Julian Schneemann) (live)  – 4:31
12- Davet (Arranged by Tolga Zafer Ozdemir) (live) Nederlands Blazers Ensemble – 4:26
13- Zolf 2 (Arranged by Willem van Merwijk) (live) Nederlands Blazers Ensemble – 8:40

References

2017 albums
Mohsen Namjoo albums